Nancy Illoh is a Nigerian journalist. She is the presenter of the MoneyShow on African Independent Television and also the media consultant and Channel Manager of Africa Business Channel in Daarsat. She is the Chief Executive Officer of African Economic Congress.

Personal life and education
Illoh is a native of Delta State and the first of six children. She was born in Lagos State, Nigeria where she had her early educational years before proceeding to Nnamdi Azikiwe University, Awka where she had a BSc. in Parasitology and Entomology.

Career
Nancy Illoh is a broadcaster, presenter and producer who produces and anchors a financial and economic programme which is shown in Nigeria and the African Continent.

In 2007, she became a part of the MoneyShow team which is a programme on AIT where business and financial interviews are conducted with African individuals. She and her team has interviewed the Former President of the African Development Bank Donald Kaberuka, Professor John Kuffor, Ex- President of Ghana, Adams Oshiomhole and Sanusi Lamido Sanusi amongst others.

Although Illoh was a science student but she found interest in arts when she wrote and directed a play on HIV while in secondary school. She later joined Delta state Television, producing and anchoring different programs as a university student. 
She joined the NTA during her NYSC days to gather experience and exposure.

She was honoured with a chieftaincy title of Adã Né kwùlí Ùwáa from his royal highness Obi Jideuwa, King of Issele Azagba, Aniocha North in Delta state.

References

Nigerian women journalists
People from Delta State
People from Lagos State
Nigerian television presenters
Nigerian women television presenters
Nnamdi Azikiwe University alumni
Year of birth missing (living people)
Living people